Urago d'Oglio is a comune in the province of Brescia, in Lombardy.  It is situated on the left bank of the river Oglio, opposite the comune of Calcio. Its coat of arms shows on the left side a black half eagle on silver, and on the right side a half castle.

References

Cities and towns in Lombardy